Walk on Water is the third album by the American musician Jerry Harrison. It was released in 1990 by Sire Records in the U.S. and Fontana Records in the UK and Europe. For the second album in a row, Harrison's backing musicians were dubbed the Casual Gods.

Harrison supported the album by touring with the Ramones, Debbie Harry, and Tom Tom Club.

Production
Alannah Currie and Tom Bailey, of Thompson Twins, contributed to the album. "I Cry for Iran" is about the Iran–Iraq War. "Cowboy's Got to Go" was influenced by Jackson Pollock.

Critical reception

The Calgary Herald wrote that "even [Harrison's] 'fun' tunes reek of academic calculation." The Chicago Tribune determined that "the Gods are a tight, funky crew capable of rocking out, playing complex solos or adding subtle sonic touches to the mix."

Track listing

Personnel

Jerry Harrison – guitar, keyboards, vocals

Additional musicians
Tawatha Agee – background vocals
Tom Bailey – keyboards
Adrian Belew – guitar
Joyce Bowden – background vocals, vocal arrangements
Ernie Brooks – bass guitar
Sherrell Harmon – background vocals
Dan Hartman – keyboards, background vocals
Rick Jaeger – drums
Jason Klagstad – guitar
Jim Liban – harmonica
Samuel Llanas – background vocals
Etienne Mboppe – bass
Abdou M'Boup – percussion
Arlene Newson – background vocals
Loveless Redmond – background vocals
Chris Spedding – guitar
Vaneese Thomas – background vocals
Brice Wassy – drums
Alex Weir – guitar
Arthur Weir – bass
Michael Webb – background vocals
Bernie Worrell – keyboards

Technical
Jerry Harrison – producer, mixing
Ernie Brooks – producer
Dan Hartman – producer, engineer
Alex Weir – producer
Bernie Worrell – producer
Tom Bailey – producer, mixing
Jay Mark – engineer, mixing
Richard Manwaring – producer
David Vartanian – producer
Tom Lord-Alge – mixing
Bob Kraushaar – mixing
Dave Jerden – mixing
James Farber – mixing
Keith Fernley – mixing 
David Henszey – mixing
Ted Jensen – mastering

References

Jerry Harrison albums
1990 albums
Sire Records albums
Fontana Records albums
Albums produced by Jerry Harrison